Flavorite Ice Cream was one of the leading commercial ice cream manufacturers in Trinidad and Tobago. It was formed in 1970 by Vernon Charles. It is also known as Flavorite Foods as well. It is located at Boundary Road, San Juan, Trinidad. It was distributed to retail outlets and also exported to other Caribbean Islands as well. Flavorite Foods acquired Romike Ltd in 2012.

The company is publicly traded and listed on the Trinidad and Tobago Stock Exchange (code: FFL).

See also 
 List of food companies

References

External links
Flavorite Ice Cream website 

Brands of Trinidad and Tobago
Ice cream brands
Food and drink companies of Trinidad and Tobago
Food and drink companies established in 1970